Alan Bruce McInally (born 10 February 1963) is a Scottish former professional footballer, who played for Ayr United, Celtic, Aston Villa, Bayern Munich and Kilmarnock.

Ayr-born McInally variously went by the nicknames of Rambo and Big Mac and he is the son of Jackie McInally, who played in Kilmarnock's title-winning side of 1965, scoring 11 goals. He won his first medal in the 1985–86 season, when Celtic won the title on goal difference from Hearts. Although he played only 16 games (with one goal scored), in his third and last season at the club (1986–87), he scored 15 goals in his 38 league games.

He then moved to English club Aston Villa, helping them win promotion in 1988. He was transferred in 1989 to German giants Bayern Munich, where he stayed for four years. In his first season at Bayern he made 31 appearances and scored 10 goals as he helped them win the 1989–90 Bundesliga. During this period he appeared in eight international games for Scotland and was selected for their 1990 FIFA World Cup squad.  After playing for Kilmarnock during the 1993–94 season, McInally retired from playing football. He has since worked in the media, most notably for the Sky Sports show Soccer Saturday. He also commentated on the FIFA 19 video game.

References

External links 

1963 births
Living people
Scottish footballers
Footballers from Ayr
Association football forwards
Scotland international footballers
Scottish Football League players
English Football League players
Bundesliga players
1990 FIFA World Cup players
Celtic F.C. players
Aston Villa F.C. players
Ayr United F.C. players
Kilmarnock F.C. players
FC Bayern Munich footballers
Scottish expatriate footballers
Scottish expatriate sportspeople in Germany
Expatriate footballers in Germany
Expatriate footballers in West Germany
Scottish expatriate sportspeople in West Germany